Libya requires its residents to register their motor vehicles and display vehicle registration plates. Current plates are European standard 520 mm × 110 mm.

Current Series
Libya's current series of license plates entered circulation in 2013, after Libyan Revolution and the overthrow of Gaddafi. Numbers on license plates are in Latin Alphabet, and all plates carry the Arabic text ليبيا meaning Libya, in Naskh Script, either on the right hand side or the right top corner.

Private Vehicles
Private vehicle license plates are black on white and follow the format [# - 1 to 999999].
The First number (#), a 1 or 2 digit number consists of a code corresponding to Municipality in Libya. This number is separated by a dash from the registration code, which can be 1 to 6 digits. In the city of Tripoli, due to its larger population, 7-digit registration codes are also issued.

Foreigner-owned Private Vehicles
Foreigner-owned Private vehicle license plates are black on white and follow the format [NN /# - 1 to 9999].
The plate consists of a 2 or 3 digit code in a blue square (NN), indicating the country of the owner of the vehicle. It also includes the municipality code, separated by dash from the registration code that is 1 to 4 digits long.

Diplomatic and Consular Vehicles
Diplomatic and consular license plates are black on red, and follow the format [1 to 99 - NN هيئة سياسية]. This type of plate does not have "ليبيا" (Libya) written on it, but instead, "هيئة سياسية", in Ruqʿah script. This means "Political Corps". The format of this license plate consists of a 1 or 2 digit number, separated by a dash from a 2 or 3 digit code indicating the country of the owner of the vehicle (NN). This code is identical to that used for Foreigner-owned private vehicles.

Agricultural Vehicles
Agricultural vehicle license plates are black on yellow and follow the format [# - 1 to 999999].
The plate starts with the Arabic letter  (Z),followed by number (#) on the left hand side, a 1 or 2 digit number consists of a code corresponding to Municipality in Libya. This number is separated by a dash from the registration code, which can be 1 to 6 digits. On a two-line plate, the positioning of the Arabic letter-code is bottom left of the license plate.

Commercial Vehicles
Commercial vehicle license plates are black on yellow and follow the format [# - 1 to 999999]. Commercial vehicles consist of trucks, buses, vans, but not taxis, and not semi-trucks.
The plate starts with the Arabic letter  (N),followed by number (#), a 1 or 2 digit number consists of a code corresponding to Municipality in Libya. This number is separated by a dash from the registration code, which can be 1 to 6 digits. On a two-line plate, the positioning of the Arabic letter-code is bottom left of the license plate.

Taxis
Taxi license plates are black on yellow and follow the format [# - 1 to 999999].
The plate starts with the Arabic letter  (R),followed by number (#), a 1 or 2 digit number consists of a code corresponding to Municipality in Libya. This number is separated by a dash from the registration code, which can be 1 to 6 digits. On a two-line plate, the positioning of the Arabic letter-code is bottom left of the license plate.

Semi-trucks
Semi-truck (Trucks that carry Semi-trailers, collectively referred to as 18-wheeler) license plates are black on yellow and follow the format [# - 1 to 999999]. Semi-trucks are allocated their own unique code from other trucks and commercial vehicles in Libya.
The plate starts with the Arabic letter  (J),followed by number (#), a 1 or 2 digit number consists of a code corresponding to Municipality in Libya. This number is separated by a dash from the registration code, which can be 1 to 6 digits. On a two-line plate, the positioning of the Arabic letter-code is bottom left of the license plate.

Trailers
Trailers or Semi-trailers(Trailers carried by Semi-trucks, collectively referred to as 18-wheeler) license plates are black on yellow and follow the format [# - 1 to 999999]. 
The plate starts with the Arabic letter  (M),followed by number (#), a 1 or 2 digit number consists of a code corresponding to Municipality in Libya. This number is separated by a dash from the registration code, which can be 1 to 6 digits. On a two-line plate, the positioning of the Arabic letter-code is bottom left of the license plate.

1998 to 2012 Series

License plates in this era had an identical colour composition as the current series, black on white for private vehicles, black on red for diplomatic vehicles, and black on yellow for other types of vehicles. Instead of ليبيا (Libya), these license plates carried the term الجماهيرية (Al-Jamahiriya) either on the right hand side or the right top corner in Ruqʿah script. Jamahiriyais an Arabic term generally translated roughly to "peopledom" or "state of the masses". This term was used, as Libya's official name under Gaddafi was Libyan Arab Jamahiriya .

The license plates had a format [XX - # - 1 to 99999] or [XX - ## - 1 to 99999]. The plate consisted of a 1 or 2 digit code corresponding to Municipality in Libya, similar to the current series. However, this number was preceded by another 1 or two digit code XX, which corresponded to the subdivisions within each municipality. For example, in Tripoli (Code 5)
 7 - 5 corresponded to Ben Ashour in Tripoli
 28 - 5 corresponded to Hay Al Andalus in Tripoli
 45 - 5 corresponded to Center of City in Tripoli

These codes have since been abolished. This  was followed by a 1 to 5 digit registration code.

Below table demonstrates an example of private vehicle license plates. As stated previously, registration plates of other vehicles have the same letter code and colour configuration as the current series, but with the difference of including the sub-municipality code, as well as including the word الجماهيرية Al-Jamahiriya instead of ليبيا Libya.

Municipality Codes
Below is the list of Municipality Vehicle registration codes in Libya.

Foreign Countries Codes

Italian Africa (1913-1941) 

The very first Italian registration plates, from 1913 to the end of the 1920s, were rectangular, with a white background and with the name or initials of the colony in red followed by the registration number, on a single line, but the documentation on this is fragmentary. For the Italian colonial troops, however, special military service plates were used with the initials SOM (Somalia) or T (Tripolitania) in front.
Subsequently, until 1935, the Italian colonies used white plates on black with a colonial code on the first line, and up to 5 numbers on the second line. The numbers, in relief, were assigned serially and the plates were made of metal, with the fasces as a seal. The colonial codes were:

ERITREA, later ER for Eritrea
SOMALIA, later SOM for Somalia
TRIPOLI for Tripolitania
CNA for Cyrenaica

References

Libya
Transport in Libya
Libya transport-related lists